In enzymology, a carboxy-cis,cis-muconate cyclase is an enzyme that catalyzes the chemical reaction

3-carboxy-2,5-dihydro-5-oxofuran-2-acetate  3-carboxy-cis,cis-muconate

Hence, this enzyme has one substrate, 3-carboxy-2,5-dihydro-5-oxofuran-2-acetate, and one product, 3-carboxy-cis,cis-muconate.

This enzyme belongs to the family of isomerases, specifically the class of intramolecular lyases.  The systematic name of this enzyme class is 3-carboxy-2,5-dihydro-5-oxofuran-2-acetate lyase (decyclizing). This enzyme is also called 3-carboxymuconate cyclase.  This enzyme participates in benzoate degradation via hydroxylation.

Structural studies

As of late 2007, only one structure has been solved for this class of enzymes, with the PDB accession code .

References

 

EC 5.5.1
Enzymes of known structure